Granit Lekaj (born 23 February 1990) is a Kosovan professional footballer who plays as a centre-back for Winterthur.

Career
Lekaj is a product of the youth academies of FC Pfäffikon and Winterthur, beginning his senior career with the reserves of the latter in 2008, before promoting to their senior team in 2010. He transferred to Wil on 20 July 2011. After 4 years at Wil and 121 appearances and 2 goals, he moved to Schaffhausen on 30 July 2015. He returned to Wil on 21 July 2017.

On 5 June 2018, Lekaj returned to his first club Winterthur on 5 June 2018. He became the captain of the club on 9 October 2021. He captained the team win the 2021–22 Swiss Challenge League and earn promotion into the Swiss Super League for the 2022–23 season.

Personal life
Born in Pristina, present day Kosovo, Lekaj moved to Switzerland at a young age.

Honours
Winterthur
 Swiss Challenge League: 2021–22

References

External links
 
 SFL Profile

1990 births
Living people
Sportspeople from Pristina
Kosovan footballers
Swiss men's footballers
Kosovan emigrants to Switzerland
Swiss people of Kosovan descent
Association football defenders
FC Winterthur players
FC Wil players
FC Schaffhausen players
Swiss Super League players
Swiss Challenge League players